Proto-Protestantism, also called pre-Protestantism, refers to individuals and movements that propagated ideas similar to Protestantism before 1517, which historians usually regard as the starting year for the Reformation era. The relationship between medieval sects and Protestantism is an issue that has been debated by historians.

Overview 
Before Martin Luther and John Calvin, some leaders tried to reform Christianity. The main forerunners of the Protestant Reformation were Peter Waldo, John Wycliffe and Jan Hus. Martin Luther himself saw it important to have forerunners of his views, and thus he praised people like Girolamo Savonarola, Lorenzo Valla, Wessel Gansfort and other groups as prefiguring some of his views.

Claimed to have prefigured Protestantism 
According to Edmund Hamer Broadbent in The Pilgrim Church, over much of the Christian era, many Christian sects, cults and movements foreshadowed the teachings of what later became the Protestant movements.

Movements that have been argued as having similar ideas as Protestantism before the Reformation are:

 Montanism and Tertullian: Montanists were a sect of ascetics that were against many developments in the early church, into which Tertullian converted. Parallels have been drawn between Montanism and modern-day movements such as Pentecostalism (including Oneness Pentecostals) and the Charismatic movement. Tertullian's attack on church authorities for "being more interested in their own power than listening to the Spirit" foreshadows Protestant reactions to papal claims.
 Antidicomarians: Antidicomarians refused to give Mary "special status" and denied her perpetual virginity, their positions on Mary became the standard in many Protestant sects.
 Aerius of Sebaste: Aerius of Sebaste is seen as a forerunner of the reformation by some Protestants, he attacked monasticism, denied fasting commandments and denied the episcopal polity.
 Helvedius: Helvedius is seen by some Protestants as a forerunner of the reformation, Helvedius opposed the doctrine of the perpetual virginity of Mary and monasticism, he was attacked by Jerome.
 Jovinian and Jovinianism (died c. 405): Jovinian was a 4th-century theologian who challenged the wave of ascetism in the 4th century, challenged the exaltation of virginity, denied the perpetual virginity of Mary, and he believed that there is no difference between abstaining from food and enjoying it with thanksgiving. Jovinian taught a perseverance doctrine similar to John Calvin, as he taught the truly regenerate will persevere to the end. Some also have argued Jovinian held grace oriented salvation views, similar to the Reformation. Jovinian is sometimes praised as an early forerunner of the reformation. It has been argued that Jovinian believed in a distinction between the visible and invisible churches, based on his statement that the Church is founded on faith, and that all in the Church are taught by God and that no "unripe" members exist within the Church and no one can enter the church "by fraud".
 Sarmatio: Sarmatio was a 4th century monk in Milan and a disciple of Jovinian, who disputed the merits of the monastic and unmarried life.
 Barbatianus: Barbatianus was a 4th century early Church theologian and a Jovinianist. Barbatianus disputed the merit of the unmarried life and opposed ascetism.

 Vigilantius (fl. c. 400): Vigilantus was a presbyter in Spain, he wrote against ascetism and the superstitions connected with it, Jerome criticized Vigilantius for forbidding the honor of the graves of the martyrs, rejection of Vigils, opposition for virginity and being against fasting for the saints. Vigilantius is seen as a forerunner of the reformation by some Protestants. Some have also attempted to connect Vigilantius with the Waldensians.
 Augustine of Hippo (354 - 430): the Augustinian views of sin and grace foreshadow Protestant views, because many reformers borrowed their views about predestination, free will and grace from Augustine. However Augustine of Hippo also shared theology in common with the Catholic church, such as Mariology, his view of baptism and some other views. The Protestant apologist James White has argued that Augustine did not accept the modern Roman Catholic view of transubstantiation, however Catholic apologist Tim Staples argued that Augustine did not deny transubstantiation.
 Paulicians: Due to supposed iconoclasm it was asserted that the sect rejected the Christian cross, rites, sacraments, the worship, and the hierarchy of the established Church, because of which Edward Gibbon considered them as "worthy precursors of Reformation".
 Byzantine Iconoclasm: this was a movement within the Eastern Church that gained imperial support in the 8th century from Leo III the Isaurian (685 – 741) and some later emperors.  They eliminated religious icons, with some violence, possibly influenced by Islam. Protestant Iconoclasts looked back to the Byzantine iconoclasts to justify their assault on religious image. Protestants in the reformation used the same Biblical and Patristic texts used by the Byzantines in the 8th and 9th centuries, to condemn religious images.
 Claudius of Turin: Claudius of Turin was the Bishop of Turin; because of his iconoclasm, he is often seen as proto-Protestant. His commentary on the Epistle to Galatians shows some of his views prefigure those expressed by both the Waldensians and Protestants centuries later. Claudius in his writings, maintained that faith is the only requirement for salvation, denies the supremacy of Peter, sees praying for the dead to be useless, attacked practices of the church and held the church to be fallible.
 Gottschalk of Orbais: Gottschalk was a 9th-century Saxon theologian who was condemned for heresy, due to his teachings on predestination and that Christ's redemption was only for the elect. The grace views of Gottschalk mirror the Protestant sola fide doctrine.
 Ratramnus: Ratramus was a theologian who died in 868. Ratramus believed that the Eucharist is merely symbolic, thus rejecting the real presence of the Eucharist. Ratramnus also believed in single predestination. The writings of Ratramus influenced Protestant theologians and contributed to the later Reformation.
 Tondrakians: Tondrakians criticized the Armenian church as rigidly structured, materialistic, they had their own priests, stressed free will and they pressed for reforms.
 Ælfric of Eynsham: Protestants have appealed to Ælfric of Eynsham as evidence for the English church not believing transubstantiation, because of his book: Sermo de sacrificio in die pascae where he defines the Eucharist.
 Berengar of Tours: Berengar of Tours (c.1005-1088), was a forerunner of the reformation. Berengar of Tours argued against transubstantiation, saying that it is against logic and the Bible, and taught that the body and blood were not "real" in the Eucharist.
 Albigenses: the Albigenses were a religious group, that first appeared around the first half of the 11th century. Despite holding to dualist ideas, the Albigenses wanted to return to a purer form of Christianity and used the New Testament as their main authority. The Albigenses also held anti clerical tendencies, denied the idea of a purgatory, the crucifix, invocation of the saints, prayers for the dead, and transubstantiation. The later Protestant reformation had flourished in areas which were previously Cathar and Waldensian strongholds. The inclusion of the Cathars or Albigenses as a Protestant forerunner has been a matter of controversy, some people in the past attempting to justify the Albigenses as Protestants have even argued against them being dualist, however without much evidence.
 Bosnian Church: Also called Krstjani, they denied the power of the Pope and were excommunicated by both the eastern and western churches. Some have claimed that the Bosnian church is an early pre-reformist church.
 Pataria: The Pataria were an 11th-century group in northern Italy, that was against corruption in the church.
 Tanchelm: Tanchelm was a 12th-century preacher who rejected the structure of the Catholic church.
 Peter Abelard: Peter Abelard was a Frenchman in around  the year 1100, he sought to include human reason as one of the ways to understand the meaning of scripture, instead of believing everything the church declares without question. He was condemned as a heretic, and his books were burned. Novelist and Abelard scholar George Moore referred to Abelard as the "first protestant" prior to Martin Luther.
 Peter of Bruys: was a French reformer who fought against the Catholic church, he rejected infant baptism and religious images.
 Henry of Lausanne: Henry of Lausanne preached in France and his followers were called Henricans, Henry condemned Catholic clergy for their wealth.
 Arnold of Brescia: Arnold of Brescia attacked the Catholic bishops for their wealth, he was hanged in 1155.
 Joachimites: Joachimite interpretations prefigured developments in Protestant hermeneutics.
 Waldensians: Waldensians were a 12th-century movement often viewed as a precursor to the Reformation. The Waldensians did not baptize infants and they rejected the use of indulgences; the Waldensians also denied transubstantiation. The Waldensians wanted to follow Jesus in poverty and simplicity. The Waldensians later joined the Protestant reformation. The Waldensian movement was started by Peter Waldo, they contested the institution of the papacy and the wealth of the church, however they still took part in the sacraments of the Catholic church.
 Fraticelli: the Fraticelli or Spiritual Franciscans were an extreme group of the Franciscans in the 12th century. The Fraticelli influenced later Protestant mystics.
 King John: During the reformation, king John was seen as a hero and as proto-Protestant martyr who suffered excommunication for his defiance of the Pope. King John was praised by John Foxe and John Bale.
 Dante Alighieri: Some early Protestant writers, such as John Foxe and John Bale tried to argue that Dante opposed papal supremacy and claimed him as a Protestant forerunner, this is because of his work "Monarchia", where he attacked temporal powers claimed by the pope. Another reason why some interpreted Dante as a proto-Protestant was due to his advocacy of the use of vernacular writing, and in his work Inferno the Archbishop Ruggieri was imprisoned, which was quoted for anticlericalism. Despite many writers claiming Dante as a proto-Protestant, his religious views still aligned with Catholicism, such as purgatory.
 Marsilius of Padua: Marsilius (born in 1270ad) is sometimes called a forerunner of the reformation. Marsilius believed that the only source of truth for a Christian are the scriptures, and he rejected the ultimate authority of the church. Marsilius believed that obedience to papal decrees is not necessary for salvation, and he believed the Papal system to be of human arrangement and not divine. The beliefs of Marsilius were largely in agreement with the Protestant reformers.
 William of Ockham: Ockhamite philosophy influenced Luther and Protestant philosophy. Luther conveyed the ethnical philosophy of Ockham into Protestantism. Ockham's stress on scripture anticipates Protestant views and some see him as a proto-Protestant.
 Thomas Bradwardine: Thomas was an English man and a teacher at Oxford. Bradwardine believed in the doctrine of predestination, Thomas died in 1349.
 Gregory of Rimini: Gregory of Rimini (1300 – November 1358) was an Italian theologian; his teachings influenced later Protestant Reformers. Rimini believed in the human inability to lead a moral life without divine grace, and in predestination.
The  movement was a democratic lay movement that stressed piety, devotion and holiness. 
 Petrarch: Many Scholars have regarded Petrarch as a proto-Protestant who challenged the Pope's dogma. 
 Strigolniki: Striginolki were a 14th-century movement in Russia that were against monasteries, the upper clergy and they perhaps were Iconoclastic. There is some debate if the Strigolniki were similar to Protestantism or more "heretical".
 Lollardy: Lollardy was a 14th-century movement that stressed the importance of scripture, denied transubstantiation and rejected the system of the papacy. The movement was started by John Wycliffe. Lollard doctrine anticipated those found in the Protestant Reformation.
 Hussites: Hussites were a 15th-century group in Bohemia, founded by Jan Hus, who was influenced by the writings of John Wycliffe. Jan Hus attacked indulgences and believed the scriptures to be the only authority for every man.
 Taborites: Taborites were a faction of the Hussite movement, they denied transubstantiation, veneration of saints, prayers for the dead, indulgences, confession to clergy and renounced oaths.
 Utraquists: Ultraquists insisted on communion under two kinds, apostolic poverty, "free preching of the gospel" and the use of Czech in scripture reading.
 Lorenzo Valla: Lorenzo Valla broke loose from an infallible church tradition and thus some call him a Protestant forerunner and prefigured some teachings of the reformation. Luther himself praised Lorenzo Valla.
 Johannes von Goch: Goch asserted that the bible is the supreme authority on doctrine, perhaps taught that faith alone is enough for salvation and questioned monasticism.
 Johann Ruchrat von Wesel: Johann attacked indulgences and rejected priesty celibacy and papal authority; he believed in predestination and in the church invisibile, and believed that the Scriptures are the only trustworthy authority.
 John of Wessel: John of Wessel attacked indulgences, rejected the Catholic doctrine of transubstantiation, Wessel believed that the pope and councils can err and layed stress on the faith of the recipient of the sacraments. While some Catholics have claimed that the identification of John of Wessel with Protestantism "exaggerates the similarities".
 Johannes Geiler von Kaysersverg: Born in 1445, Johannes was concerned for moral reform in Strasbourg, and preached about God's justice. His reforms laid groundwork for the later Protestant reform in Strasbourg.
 Girolamo Savonarola was an Italian preacher and reformer, he was born in 1452 and died in 1498. Historians believe that Girolamo Savonarola influenced Luther, and possibly also John Calvin. Despite having many beliefs that align with Roman Catholicism, Savonarola believed in divine grace, such as Protestants do. Savonarola declared, that good works are not a cause of predestination but result of predestination. His followers were called the Piagnoni. Savonarola never abandoned the dogmas of the Roman Catholic church, however his protests against papal corruption, reliance on the bible as the main guide link Savonarola with the reformation. Although some dispute the inclusion of Girolamo Savonarola as a proto-Protestant.
 Pico della Mirandola: Pico della Mirandola published 900 theses against Rome, where he argued that "this is my body" must be seen symbolically and that no images should be adored. Pico was also an admirer of Girolamo Savonarola.
 Johann Reuchlin: Johann Reuchlin was a scholar, who got his master's decree in 1477, and later went through other studies. When the reformation had begun, he never left the Catholic church but was suspected of leaning towards reformation ideas. Later his grandnephew, Melanchthon joined the Protestant reformation.
 Johannes von Staupitz: Johannes was born in 1460 and served as Luther's superior in the Augustinian order, Staupitz stressed the doctrine of unconditional election.
 Faber Stapulensis: Faber was a forerunner of Luther in France, and anticipated the doctrine of justification by faith. Jacques Lefèvre d’Etaples wrote commentaries on the bible which influenced Martin Luther.
 Erasmus: Erasmus was born only 20 years before Luther in the Netherlands. Despite Erasmus not supporting many radical reforms that Luther brought forward, Erasmus was still sympathetic towards some of Luther's beliefs and prefigured some of his ideas, most notably that everyone should be able to read the bible in their own languages. Erasmus sometimes defended Luther when he was in trouble, yet did not defend all of his teachings as he felt that the doctrine of sola fide was too divisive. Erasmus' contemporaries charged him with "laying the egg that Luther hatched".

Baptist opinion 
Baptist successionism postulates an unbroken lineage of churches which have held beliefs similar to those of current Baptists. Groups often included in this lineage include the Montanists, Novationists, Donatists, Paulicians, Albigenses, Waldenses, Petrobrusians, Arnoldists, Henricians, Hussites (partly), Lollards (partly) and Anabaptists. Baptist successionism proposes that groups such as Bogomils or Paulicians were Baptist in doctrine instead of Gnostic.

See also 
 Augustinian Calvinism
 Comparison of Catharism and Protestantism
 History of Protestantism
 Landmarkism
 Preachership
 The Trail of Blood
 Ethiopian Orthodox Tewahedo Church
 Proto-orthodox Christianity

References

Further reading 
 
 Stephen D. Bows: Reform before the Reformation : Vincenzo Querini and the religious Renaissance in Italy, Leiden [et al.], 2002.
 Walter Rügert: John Wyclif, Jan Hus, Martin Luther: Wegbereiter der Reformation Konstanz, 2017.
 E. H. Broadbent: The Pilgrim Church, Pickering & Inglis, 1937.

 
Christian radicalism
History of Protestantism
Schisms in Christianity